Diehr is a surname. Notable people with this name include:
James R. Diehr, inventor, plaintiff in legal case Diamond v. Diehr
 (born 1947), German badminton player
Paula Diehr, American biostatistician
Wolfgang Diehr, science fiction novelist, author of Fuzzy Ergo Sum